Podochilus warnagalensis is a species of epiphytic or lithophytic orchid endemic to Sri Lanka.

Description
The plant is similar to P. malabaricus. Leaves shorter and larger. Flower completely opened and whitish pink in color. peduncle purplish. labellum with blunt apex, spur longe and narrow. It can grow on lichen and moss which is covered granite rocks and boulders in streams.

References

Eriinae
Orchids of Asia
Plants described in 2016